I'm Tee, Me Too (I'm Tee, Me Too;  "Different People - I'm Tee, Me Too") is a 2020 Thai television series starring Atthaphan Phunsawat (Gun), Perawat Sangpotirat (Krist), Prachaya Ruangroj (Singto), Tawan Vihokratana (Tay), Jumpol Adulkittiporn (Off) and Thitipoom Techaapaikhun (New). The series follows an orphaned young man who rents out his house to five others who share the same nickname as his but have starkly different personalities.

Directed by Nuttapong Mongkolsawas and produced by GMMTV, the series was one of the two television series launched by GMMTV together with AIS Play on 8 July 2020. It premiered on GMM 25 and AIS Play on 18 September 2020, airing on Fridays at 21:30 ICT. The series concluded on 6 November 2020 and replaced by Tonhon Chonlatee on its timeslot on GMM25. The series had an rerun from 23 October to 14 November 2021 every Saturdays and Sundays at 20:30 (8:30 pm) on GMM25 replacing the Saturday and Sunday rerun of Fish upon the Sky in its timeslot. It was succeeded by the reruns of Our Skyy in its timeslot.

Synopsis 
After his mom passed away, college student Watee a.k.a. "Tee" (Perawat Sangpotirat) has to find a way to keep the house. He then decides to rent out its rooms and ends up living with five individuals who, like him, are all nicknamed "Tee" — T-Rex (Atthaphan Phunsawat), Maitee (Prachaya Ruangroj), Tee-Do (Tawan Vihokratana), Maetee (Jumpol Adulkittiporn) and Teedet (Thitipoom Techaapaikhun). Soon, Watee and the five boarders have to deal with their different fears and eccentricities.

Cast and characters 
Below are the cast of the series:

Main 
 Atthaphan Phunsawat (Gun) as Watee "T-Rex" Reuangritthiroj
 A psychology student who is one of the five boarders in Watee's house; the series' narrator. T-Rex came to live in Watee's house due to his fear of living alone and out of his curiosity of knowing he is Watee's namesake. He later discovers that Watee is his half-brother.

 Perawat Sangpotirat (Krist) as Watee Reuangritthiroj
 An architecture student who owns a house near the university. Watee lives alone in his house since his mom's death, and is reserved and overly suspicious of everything. When he learns that the bank will take the house due to his late mother's unpaid mortgages, he resolves to rent out its rooms. Soon, he ends up having five boarders who are all nicknamed "Tee". He is later identified as T-Rex's half-brother and the original "Watee Reuangritthiroj."

 Prachaya Ruangroj (Singto) as Maitee
 A food science student who is the eldest of the five boarders in Watee's house. Maitee loves to cook and is very by the book. He has a strange phobia — being scared of good news. He is later revealed as Watee's childhood friend.

 Tawan Vihokratana (Tay) as Tee-Do
 A music student who is one of the five boarders in Watee's house. Teedo is overly sensitive to the sound of chewing. He cannot bear listening to even the relatively quieter chewing noises that he has to put headphones on during meals.

 Jumpol Adulkittiporn (Off) as Maetee
 A communication arts student who is one of the five boarders in Watee's house. Maetee is an imaginative and overly delusional scriptwriter who is extremely scared of ghosts.

 Thitipoom Techaapaikhun (New) as Teeradech "Teedet" Jutikasem
 A forestry student who is one of the five boarders in Watee's house. Foul-mouthed and straightforward, Teedet busies himself with exercising and taking care of the plants in and around the house. He is very scared of beautiful women that he faints if he sees one.

Supporting 
 Lapisara Intarasut (Apple) as Soundlab
 Tee-Do's new love interest after breaking up with Ink.

 Rachanun Mahawan (Film) as Looksorn "Sorn" Thanyawan
 A girl introduced by T-Rex and Maetee in a bid to cure Teedet's fear of beautiful women; T-Rex's friend and Teedet's love interest.

 Narumon Phongsupan (Koy) as Ple
 Maitee's mother

 Angsana Buranon (Muay) as the identical twin sisters Ploy and Pim
 Ploy: Watee's late mother. Ploy was Tin's wife who raised Watee alone after Tin lost his memories and lived a new life.
 Pim: Watee's aunt. Pim was mistaken by Maetee to be the ghost of the late Ploy when Maetee was home-alone and she came to the house unannounced.

  as Watin "Tin" Reuangritthiroj
 T-Rex's father. Tin is later revealed to be also Watee's father and the late Ploy's husband. He lost his memories of Ploy after a car accident and began living a new life with his second wife (T-Rex's mother). He named his second son T-Rex with Watee's name, leading to T-Rex and Watee becoming namesakes of each other.

 Sumontha Suanpholaat (Jum) as Maetee's mother

Guest role 
 Chanya McClory (Nink) as Ink ( 1)
 Tee-Do's and Maitee's ex-girlfriend.

 Thanaset Suriyapornchaikul (Euro) as a young Teedet (Ep. 5)
 Parassara Dejkraisak (Frappe) as Cherry (Ep. 5)
 Teedet's childhood love interest and the reason of his venustraphobia.

 Thanyanan Pipatchaisiri (Natty) as Euang (Ep. 3)
 Nattawat Finkler (Patrick) as T-Bone (Ep. 8)
 Nipawan Taveepornsawan (Kai) as T-Rex's Mother ( 7 & 8)

Soundtrack 
The theme song of the series is "เล็ก ๆ บ่อย ๆ/Lek Lek Boi Boi"/Small, Often by Gungun.

Below is an incomprehensive list of background music used in the series. The numbers in parentheses indicate the episode the music appears.

Episodes

Reception 
The television ratings of the series in Thailand is shown below.  represents the lowest rating and  represent the highest ratings.

International broadcast 
Philippines – The series was released on 18 September 2020 via iWantTFC (owned and operated by ABS-CBN Corporation) simultaneously with its Thailand broadcast, both in Filipino dub and original Thai audio.
Japan – On 28 September 2020,  announced that it had acquired distribution rights of three television series from GMMTV, which included the said series, and is scheduled to be distributed locally in Japanese subtitles by early 2021.

Notes

References

External links 
I'm Tee, Me Too on AIS Play

I'm Tee, Me Too on GMM 25 website 
I'm Tee, Me Too (2020) Official Trailer
GMMTV

Television series by GMMTV
2020 Thai television series debuts
2020 Thai television series endings
Thai comedy television series
GMM 25 original programming